ABIM may refer to:

 American Baptist International Ministries, an international Protestant Christian missionary society
 American Board of Internal Medicine, a non-profit, independent physician evaluation organization
 Angkatan Belia Islam Malaysia, an Islamic organisation founded by Muslim students
 Annual Biocontrol Industry Meeting, an annual conference of manufacturers of biological plant protection products

See also

 Abim (disambiguation)